Matija Širok (born 31 May 1991) is a Slovenian footballer who plays as a right-back for Gorica.

Club career
On 22 August 2014, Širok signed a two-year contract with Italian Serie A club Parma, but was immediately loaned back to Gorica for the 2014–15 season. He never returned to Parma as the club went bankrupt in 2015. Afterwards, he signed for Gorica as a free agent.

References

External links

NZS profile 

1991 births
Living people
People from Šempeter pri Gorici
Slovenian footballers
Slovenia youth international footballers
Slovenia under-21 international footballers
Slovenian expatriate footballers
Association football fullbacks
ND Gorica players
Parma Calcio 1913 players
Jagiellonia Białystok players
NK Domžale players
Pafos FC players
Slovenian PrvaLiga players
Ekstraklasa players
Cypriot First Division players
Slovenian Second League players
Slovenian expatriate sportspeople in Italy
Expatriate footballers in Italy
Slovenian expatriate sportspeople in Poland
Expatriate footballers in Poland
Slovenian expatriate sportspeople in Cyprus
Expatriate footballers in Cyprus